Ming Veevers-Carter is a florist who represented New Covent Garden Market at the 2016 Chelsea Flower Show.  She designed a floral portrait of the Queen which was the centrepiece of 10,000 flowers and foliage stems in a display called "Behind Every Great Florist".  Photographs of this with the Queen appeared in the press, and the display won a gold medal and the Royal Horticultural Society's New Design award.

Her work now focusses on creating floral installations for events at places such as the National Gallery, Saatchi Gallery, Tate Modern and Victoria and Albert Museum.  These are large floral displays built on armatures.

Veevers-Carter wrote Celebration Flowers: Designing & Arranging (1990), which Library Journal called a "useful as an idea book and as a guide to the techniques and materials used in flower arranging."

References

Florists
Living people
Year of birth missing (living people)